Hoedeok station (Korean:회덕역, Hanja:懷德驛) is a railway station on the Gyeongbu Line.

Gallery

Railway stations in Daejeon